Stephanie Wales is an Australian rules footballer playing for the Essendon Football Club in the AFL Women's (AFLW). Wales was recruited by Essendon with the 32nd pick in the 2022 AFL Women's draft. She is the twin sister of  player Lucy Wales.

AFL Women's career
Wales debuted for the Bombers in the opening round of season seven, playing in Essendon's inaugural AFL Women's team. On debut, she collected four disposals and 12 hitouts. Wales earned a nomination for the AFL Women's season seven Rising Star award in round 8 after accumulating 21 hitouts and seven tackles against .

Statistics
Updated to the end of round 9, S7 (2022).

|-
| S7 (2022) ||  || 30
| 9 || 3 || 1 || 45 || 40 || 85 || 7 || 20 || 112 || 0.3 || 0.1 || 5.0 || 4.4 || 9.4 || 0.8 || 2.2 || 12.4 || 
|- class=sortbottom
! colspan=3 | Career
! 9 !! 3 !! 1 !! 45 !! 40 !! 85 !! 7 !! 20 !! 112 !! 0.3 !! 0.1 !! 5.0 !! 4.4 !! 9.4 !! 0.8 !! 2.2 !! 12.4 !! 
|}

Honours and achievements
 Essendon equal games record holder
 AFL Women's Rising Star nominee: S7

References

External links
 
 Steph Wales at AustralianFootball.com
 

2003 births
Living people
Essendon Football Club (AFLW) players
Australian rules footballers from Victoria (Australia)